Léopold De Groof (2 February 1896 – 26 June 1984) was a Belgian footballer. He played in two matches for the Belgium national football team in 1921.

References

External links
 

1896 births
1984 deaths
Belgian footballers
Belgium international footballers
Footballers from Lille
Association football defenders